Nikita Uglov (born 11 October 1993) is a Russian sprinter.

He finished seventh in the 400 metres at the 2010 Summer Youth Olympics in Singapore. He then helped the European mixed-NOC team to win the silver medal in the medley relay.

References

External links

1993 births
Living people
Russian male sprinters
Athletes (track and field) at the 2010 Summer Youth Olympics
European Athletics Championships medalists
21st-century Russian people